= Antoine Lake =

- Location within Alberta
- Location: Alberta, Canada
- Coordinates: 54°46′02″N 112°05′16″W
- Type: lake

Antoine Lake is a lake in Alberta, Canada.

Antoine Lake has the name of Antoine Desjarlais, a Metis, pioneer fur trader.
